The World Communication Awards (WCA) were established in 1999 to recognise excellence amongst global telecom operators. The first awards were presented in Geneva during ITU Telecom '99 and were held at the Espace Sécheron More recent awards have been presented in London drawing an audience of around 500 senior executives from the telecommunications industry.

Over the years, the World Communication Awards have evolved from being purely for telecom operators to encompass the broader telecom and ICT industry, with categories applicable to telecom operators and service providers, as well as vendors. In 2011 a sister event, the Asia Communication Awards was launched and is held annually in Singapore. 

The World Communication Awards are organised by Total Telecom and their owners Terrapinn. It celebrated its 10th year in 2008 with fifteen categories being presented, and with the chairman of the judges being David Molony, former editor-in-chief of Total Telecom and now an analyst at consultants Ovum.

Over the years the WCA have become more wide-ranging and international, with the 2007 winners including Bharti Airtel, Minick, BT, NTT Comm, SpinVox, Afsat, Orange, ip.access, Botswana Telecom, TeliaSonera, and Viviane Reding.

In 2016, Vodafone Carrier Services received the "Best Network transformation Initiative" award during the WCA, in London. 

The 2017 edition of the WCA was marked by the nomination of Ernest Cu -President and CEO of Globe Telecom- as the "CEO of the year".

In 2020 best customer experience was won by Macquarie Telecom Group and their CEO David Tudehope also won CEO of the Year

 Article improvement notices

See also 

 IEEE Alexander Graham Bell Medal, an award for scientific and engineering achievements in telecommunications

References

External links 
 WCA website

Telecommunications organizations
Awards established in 1999
Business and industry awards